The Sardinian pika (Prolagus sardus) is an extinct species of pika that was endemic to the islands of Sardinia, Corsica and neighbouring Mediterranean islands until its extinction likely in Roman times. Unlike living pikas, which all belong to the genus Ochotona, the Sardinian pika was the last surviving member of the genus Prolagus, a genus of pika once widespread throughout western Eurasia and North Africa during the Miocene and Pliocene epochs.

Anatomy

The full skeletal structure of the Sardinian pika was reconstructed in 1967, thanks to the numerous finds of bones in Corbeddu Cave, which is near Oliena, Sardinia. Some years later, from these remains, the same researchers led by paleontologist Mary R. Dawson from the US were able to create a plaster reconstruction with good accuracy. The Sardinian pika was probably much stockier and more robust than extant species of pikas, and it probably resembled a sort of cross between a large wild rabbit and a pika. The first articulated skeletons of P. sardus were reported in 2016.

Prolagus sardus weighed about 504-525 g. This is more than its ancestor Prolagus figaro, which is the only other member of Prolagus that was found in Sardinia and weighed about 398-436 g, and is larger than most mainland species of Prolagus.

Compared to mainland species of Prolagus, P. sardus has increased hypsodonty (high crowned teeth) and enamel folding complexity, as well as shifts in the positions of occlusal surface elements on the lower third premolar. These likely represent adaptions to the arid and open landscapes of the Corsica-Sardinia landmass. The Sardinian pika experienced anagenic evolution, with an increasing body size and shifting dental morphology over time.

Ecology
Abundant fossil and subfossil remains of P. sardus are known from several localities across Corsica and Sardinia hint at the once broad geographical range of this Prolagus species: it lived from sea level up to at least 800 m (2,624 ft.) in a variety of habitats (grasslands, shrublands) whereby it could dig burrows. Its diet was strictly vegetarian. The abundance of mass accumulations of broken bones (bone beds) suggest that the population density was high. The Sardinian pika was likely preyed on by the two native species of terrestrial carnivores, the Sardinian dhole, and mustelid Enhydrictis galictoides, which were specialized for hunting small prey. Other likely predators include birds of prey such as the endemic owl species Bubo insularis.

Evolution and extinction
The ancestor of the Sardinian pika, Prolagus figaro, arrived in the Corsican-Sardinian microcontinent at the early-late Pliocene boundary around 3.6 million years ago, likely due to an emergent land connection with Italy caused by a sea level drop. Amongst mainland species, the P. figaro-P. sardus lineage was previously thought to be most closely related to the species P. depereti known from the Pliocene of France, which was originally described as a subspecies of P. figaro. However, the oldest known remains of Prolagus from Sardinia, referred to as P. aff. figaro, show closer affinities to the species P. sorbinii, a species of Eastern European origin, which expanded westwards during the Messinian, the last stage of the Miocene, with well known remains from central Italy from the latest Miocene and early Pliocene. The oldest unambiguous remains of Prolagus sardus date back from the Middle Pleistocene, a time when both islands were periodically connected due to sea level changes. Reassessment of palaeontological data has shown that the distinction made by early authors between two contemporaneous taxa (P. sardus and P. corsicanus) is probably unfounded, as the Sardinian pika exhibits only subtle anagenetic evolution of its anatomy and body size through time.

Humans first arrived in Corsica-Sardinia around 10,000 years Before Present (BP). The presence of Prolagus facilitated the establishment of the first human communities of the islands. Jean-Denis Vigne found clear evidence that the Sardinian pika was hunted and eaten by people. He found that many of the Sardinian pikas' limb bones were broken and burnt at one end, suggesting that this animal had been roasted and eaten by the Neolithic colonists of Corsica.

The Sardinian pika became extinct in Corsica and Sardinia sometime after 810 BC, probably during Roman times due to agricultural practices, the introduction of predators (dogs, cats and small mustelids) and ecological competitors (rodents, rabbits and hares). Transmission of pathogens by rabbits and hares introduced to Sardinia and Corsica by the Romans may have also played a role in the species's extinction. Other endemic small mammals like the shrew Asoriculus similis, the Tyrrhenian field rat, and the Tyrrhenian vole, probably also disappeared from Corsica and Sardinia around the same time.

Historical references
The 2nd century BCE Greek historian Polybius described in The Histories the presence of an animal in Corsica locally called the kyniklos which "when seen from a distance looks like a small hare, but when captured it differs much from a hare in appearance and taste" and which "lives for the most part under the ground". This animal may have been the Sardinian pika, because Corsica at that time was not characterized by the occurrence of any species of hare. The most recent zooarchaeological remains of pikas in Corsica were dated to either late pre-Roman or Roman times, between 348 BCE and 283 CE. 

Survival of the Sardinian pika up into modern history has been hypothesised from the description of unknown mammals by later Sardinian authors; however, this interpretation remains dubious owing to anatomical discrepancies. The Medieval Italian poet Fazio Degli Uberti mentioned "a small animal" in Sardinia which was very timid and was called "Solifughi", which means "hiding from the sun", in his 1360 poem Dittamondo ('Song of the World'). In 1774, Francesco Cetti wrote that the island of Tavolara off the coast of Sardinia had "giant rats whose burrows are so abundant that one might think the surface of the soil had been recently turned over by pigs", which has often been taken as a reference to the Sardinian pika. However, this was questioned by Barbara Wilkens in a 2000 publication, who suggested that it was more likely that the animals mentioned by Cetti were brown rats.

References

Pikas
Extinct mammals of Europe
Mammal extinctions since 1500
Fauna of Sardinia
Fauna of Corsica
Mammals described in 1829